Mahu is a village in Jawali tehsil.
Mahu is a village panchayat located in the [[Satara
district]] of Maharashtra state, India. The latitude
17.8847181 and longitude 73.81543940000009
are the geocoordinate of the Mahu.

Villages in Satara district